WLKG (96.1 FM, "Lake 96.1") is a radio station broadcasting a hot adult contemporary music radio format. Licensed to Lake Geneva, Wisconsin, United States, the station serves Walworth,  Racine and Kenosha counties in Wisconsin and McHenry County, Illinois.  The station is currently owned by CTJ Communications, Ltd.

History
The station was assigned call sign WLKG and signed on June 6, 1994.

References

External links

LKG
Hot adult contemporary radio stations in the United States
Radio stations established in 1994
1994 establishments in Wisconsin